Tieback may refer to:
Tieback (geotechnical), a method of supporting retaining walls
Tieback (subsea), a connection between a new oil and gas discovery and an existing production facility, such as the Brae oilfield
Curtain tie-back, a kind of decorative window treatment